Epictetus (Epíktētos;  50   135 AD) was a Greek Stoic philosopher. He was born into slavery at Hierapolis, Phrygia (present-day Pamukkale, in western Turkey) and lived in Rome until his banishment, when he went to Nicopolis in northwestern Greece for the rest of his life. His teachings were written down and published by his pupil Arrian in his Discourses and Enchiridion.

Epictetus taught that philosophy is a way of life and not simply a theoretical discipline. To Epictetus, all external events are beyond our control; we should accept whatever happens calmly and dispassionately. However, individuals are responsible for their own actions, which they can examine and control through rigorous self-discipline.

Life 
Epictetus was born around AD 50, presumably at Hierapolis, Phrygia. The name his parents gave him is unknown; the word epíktētos (ἐπίκτητος) in Greek simply means "gained" or "acquired"; the Greek philosopher Plato, in his Laws, used the term to mean property that is "added to one's hereditary property". He spent his youth in Rome as a slave to Epaphroditus, a wealthy freedman and secretary to Nero.

Early in life, Epictetus acquired a passion for philosophy and, with the permission of his wealthy master, he studied Stoic philosophy under Musonius Rufus. Becoming more educated in this way raised his social status. At some point, he became disabled. Celsus, quoted by Origen, wrote that this was because his leg had been deliberately broken by his master.<ref>Origen, Contra Celcus. vii.]</ref> Simplicius, in contrast, wrote that he had simply been disabled from childhood.

Epictetus obtained his freedom sometime after the death of Nero in AD 68, and he began to teach philosophy in Rome. Around AD 93, when the Roman emperor Domitian banished all philosophers from the city, Epictetus moved to Nicopolis in Epirus, Greece, where he founded a school of philosophy.

His most famous pupil, Arrian, studied under him as a young man (around AD 108) and claimed to have written his famous Discourses based on the notes he took on Epictetus's lectures. Arrian argued that his Discourses should be considered comparable to the Socratic literature. Arrian described Epictetus as a powerful speaker who could "induce his listener to feel just what Epictetus wanted him to feel." Many eminent figures sought conversations with him. Emperor Hadrian was friendly with him, and may have heard him speak at his school in Nicopolis.A surviving second or third century work, Altercatio Hadriani Et Epicteti gives a fictitious account of a conversation between Hadrian and Epictetus.

He lived a life of great simplicity, with few possessions. He lived alone for a long time, but in his old age, he adopted a friend's child who otherwise would have been left to die and raised him with the aid of a woman. It is unclear whether Epictetus and she were married. He died sometime around AD 135. After his death, according to Lucian, his oil lamp was purchased by an admirer for 3,000 drachmae.

 Thought 

No writings by Epictetus are known. His discourses were transcribed and compiled by his pupil Arrian. The main work is The Discourses, four books of which have been preserved (out of the original eight). Arrian also compiled a popular digest, entitled the Enchiridion, or Handbook. In a preface to the Discourses that is addressed to Lucius Gellius, Arrian states that "whatever I heard him say I used to write down, word for word, as best I could, endeavouring to preserve it as a memorial, for my own future use, of his way of thinking and the frankness of his speech." In the sixth century, the Neoplatonist philosopher Simplicius wrote an extant commentary on the Enchiridion.

Epictetus maintains that the foundation of all philosophy is self-knowledge; that is, the conviction of our ignorance and gullibility ought to be the first subject of our study. Logic provides valid reasoning and certainty in judgment, but it is subordinate to practical needs. The first and most necessary part of philosophy concerns the application of doctrine, for example, that people should not lie. The second concerns reasons, e.g., why people should not lie. While the third, lastly, examines and establishes the reasons. This is the logical part, which finds reasons, shows what is a reason, and that a given reason is a correct one. This last part is necessary, but only on account of the second, which again is rendered necessary by the first.

Both the Discourses and the Enchiridion begin by distinguishing between those things in our power (prohairetic things) and those things not in our power (aprohairetic things).
That alone is in our power, which is our own work; and in this class are our opinions, impulses, desires, and aversions. On the contrary, what is not in our power, are our bodies, possessions, glory, and power. Any delusion on this point leads to the greatest errors, misfortunes, and troubles, and to the slavery of the soul.

We have no power over external things, and the good that ought to be the object of our earnest pursuit, is to be found only within ourselves. The determination between what is good and what is not good is made by the capacity for choice (prohairesis). Prohairesis allows us to act, and gives us the kind of freedom that only rational animals have. It is determined by our reason, which of all our faculties, sees and tests itself and everything else. It is the correct use of the impressions (phantasia) that bombard the mind that is in our power:
Practice then from the start to say to every harsh impression, "You are an impression, and not at all the thing you appear to be." Then examine it and test it by these rules you have, and firstly, and chiefly, by this: whether the impression has to do with the things that are up to us, or those that are not; and if it has to do with the things that are not up to us, be ready to reply, "It is nothing to me."
We will not be troubled at any loss, but will say to ourselves on such an occasion: "I have lost nothing that belongs to me; it was not something of mine that was torn from me, but something that was not in my power has left me." Nothing beyond the use of our opinion is properly ours. Every possession rests on opinion. What is to cry and to weep? An opinion. What is misfortune, or a quarrel, or a complaint? All these things are opinions; opinions founded on the delusion that what is not subject to our own choice can be either good or evil, which it cannot. By rejecting these opinions, and seeking good and evil in the power of choice alone, we may confidently achieve peace of mind in every condition of life.

Reason alone is good, the irrational is evil, and the irrational is intolerable to the rational. The good person should labour chiefly on their own reason; to perfect this is in our power. To repel evil opinions by the good is the noble contest in which humans should engage; it is not an easy task, but it promises true freedom, peace of mind (ataraxia), and a divine command over the emotions (apatheia). We should especially be on our guard against the opinion of pleasure because of its apparent sweetness and charms. The first object of philosophy, therefore, is to purify the mind.

Epictetus teaches that the preconceptions (prolepsis) of good and evil are common to all. Good alone is profitable and to be desired, and evil is hurtful and to be avoided. Different opinions arise only from the application of these preconceptions to particular cases, and it is then that the darkness of ignorance, which blindly maintains the correctness of its own opinion, must be dispelled. People entertain different and conflicting opinions of good, and in their judgment of a particular good, people frequently contradict themselves. Philosophy should provide a standard for good and evil. This process is greatly facilitated because the mind and the works of the mind are alone in our power, whereas all external things that aid life are beyond our control.

The essence of divinity is goodness; we have all good that could be given to us. The deities too gave us the soul and reason, which is not measured by breadth or depth, but by knowledge and sentiments, and by which we attain to greatness, and may equal even with the deities. We should, therefore, cultivate the mind with special care. If we wish for nothing, but what God wills, we shall be truly free, and all will come to pass with us according to our desire; and we shall be as little subject to restraint as Zeus himself.

Every individual is connected with the rest of the world, and the universe is fashioned for universal harmony. Wise people, therefore, will pursue, not merely their own will, but also will be subject to the rightful order of the world. We should conduct ourselves through life fulfilling all our duties as children, siblings, parents, and citizens.

For our country or friends we ought to be ready to undergo or perform the greatest difficulties. The good person, if able to foresee the future, would peacefully and contentedly help to bring about their own sickness, maiming, and even death, knowing that this is the correct order of the universe. We have all a certain part to play in the world, and we have done enough when we have performed what our nature allows. In the exercise of our powers, we may become aware of the destiny we are intended to fulfil.

We are like travellers at an inn or guests at a stranger's table; whatever is offered we take with thankfulness, and sometimes, when the turn comes, we may refuse; in the former case we are a worthy guest of the deities, and in the latter we appear as a sharer in their power. Anyone who finds life intolerable is free to quit it, but we should not abandon our appointed role without sufficient reason. The Stoic sage will never find life intolerable and will complain of no one, neither deity nor human. Those who go wrong we should pardon and treat with compassion, since it is from ignorance that they err, being as it were, blind.

It is only our opinions and principles that can render us unhappy, and it is only the ignorant person who finds fault with another. Every desire degrades us, and renders us slaves of what we desire. We ought not to forget the transitory character of all external advantages, even in the midst of our enjoyment of them; but always to bear in mind that they are not our own, and that therefore, they do not properly belong to us. Thus prepared, we shall never be carried away by opinions.

The final entry of the Enchiridion, or Handbook, begins: "Upon all occasions we ought to have these maxims ready at hand":

Conduct me, Zeus, and thou, Destiny,
Wherever thy decree has fixed my lot.
I follow willingly; and, did I not,
Wicked and wretched would I follow still.
(Diogenes Laërtius quoting Cleanthes; quoted also by Seneca, Epistle 107.)"

Whoe'er yields properly to Fate is deemed
Wise among men, and knows the laws of Heaven.
(From Euripides' Fragments, 965)

Crito, if it thus pleases the gods, thus let it be.
(From Plato's Crito)

Anytus and Meletus may indeed kill me, but they cannot harm me.
(From Plato's Apology)

 Influence 
Dialogue between the Emperor Hadrian and Epictetus

Epictetus appears in a 2nd or 3rd century Dialogue between the Emperor Hadrian and Epictetus the Philosopher. This short Latin text consists of seventy-three short questions supposedly posed by Hadrian and answered by Epictetus. This dialogue was very popular in the Middle Ages with many translations and adaptations.

 Philosophy 
 Marcus Aurelius 
The philosophy of Epictetus influenced the Roman emperor Marcus Aurelius (AD 121 to AD 180), who cites Epictetus in his Meditations.

 Philosophers of the French Enlightenment 
Voltaire, Montesquieu, Denis Diderot and Baron d'Holbach all read the Enchiridion when they were students.

 Literature 
The philosophy of Epictetus plays a key role in the 1998 novel A Man in Full by Tom Wolfe. This was in part the outcome of discussions Wolfe had with James Stockdale (see below). The character Conrad, who through a series of mishaps finds himself in jail and accidentally acquires a copy of the Enchiridion of Epictetus, the Stoic's manual, discovers a philosophy that strengthens him to endure the brutality of the prison environment. He experiences Joseph Campbell's 'hero's journey' call to action and becomes a strong, honorable, undefeatable protagonist. The importance of Epictetus' Stoicism for Stockdale, its role in A Man in Full, and its significance in Ridley Scott's film Gladiator are discussed by William O. Stephens in The Rebirth of Stoicism?.

Mohun Biswas, in the novel A House for Mr Biswas (1961), by V.S. Naipaul, is pleased to think himself a follower of Epictetus and Marcus Aurelius; the irony is that he never actually behaves as a Stoic.

"Everything has two handles, the one by which it may be carried, the other by which it cannot" is the theme of Disturbances in the Field (1983), by Lynne Sharon Schwartz. Lydia, the central character, turns often to The Golden Sayings of Epictetus – the latter being a modern selection from Epictetus's writings, compiled and translated by Hastings Crossley.

A line from the Enchiridion is used as a title quotation in The Life and Opinions of Tristram Shandy, Gentleman by Laurence Sterne, which translates to, "Not things, but opinions about things, trouble men."

Epictetus is mentioned in A Portrait of the Artist as a Young Man by James Joyce: in the fifth chapter of the novel the protagonist Stephen Dedalus discusses Epictetus's famous lamp with a dean of his college. Epictetus also is mentioned briefly in Franny and Zooey by J. D. Salinger, and is referred to by Theodore Dreiser in his novel Sister Carrie. Both the longevity of Epictetus's life and his philosophy are alluded to in John Berryman's poem, "Of Suicide."

Epictetus is referred to, but not mentioned by name, in Matthew Arnold's sonnet "To a Friend". Arnold provides three historical personalities as his inspiration and support in difficult times (Epictetus is preceded by Homer and succeeded by Sophocles):
Much he, whose friendship I not long since won,
That halting slave, who in Nicopolis
Taught Arrian, when Vespasian's brutal son
Cleared Rome of what most shamed him.

 François Rabelais 
In the Chapter XXX of François Rabelais' Pantagruel (c. 1532), Pantagruel's tutor Epistemon had his head cut off after a battle. After he had his head reattached and was brought back to life, he recounts his experience of the damned in hell:

 Military 
 James Stockdale 

James Stockdale, a fighter pilot who was shot down while serving in the Vietnam War, was influenced by Epictetus. He was introduced to his works while at Stanford University. In Courage under Fire: Testing Epictetus's Doctrines in a Laboratory of Human Behavior (1993), Stockdale credits Epictetus with helping him endure his seven and a half years in captivity, which included torture and four years in solitary confinement. When he was shot down, he reportedly said to himself "I'm leaving the world of technology and entering the world of Epictetus!" as he bailed out.

Quoting Epictetus, Stockdale concludes the book with: The emotions of grief, pity, and even affection are well-known disturbers of the soul. Grief is the most offensive; Epictetus considered the suffering of grief an act of evil. It is a willful act, going against the will of God to have all men share happiness.

 Psychology 
Psychologist Albert Ellis, the founder of Rational Emotive Behavior Therapy, credited Epictetus with providing a foundation for his system of psychotherapy.

 Religion 
Kiyozawa Manshi, a controversial reformer within the Higashi Honganji branch of Jodo Shinshu Buddhism, cited Epictetus as one of the three major influences on his spiritual development and thought.

See also
 List of slaves

 Notes 

 Further reading 
Primary sources
 All the Works of Epictetus, Which are Now Extant, Elizabeth Carter (trans.) (1758) 
 Discourses, Fragments, Handbook, Robin Hard (trans.), Oxford: Oxford University Press, 2014. 
 Discourses and Selected Writings, Robert Dobbin (trans.), Oxford: Penguin Classics, 2008 .
 The Discourses (The Handbook, Fragments), Robin Hard (trans.), Christopher Gill (contrib.), Everyman Edition, 2003 .
 Epictetus Discourses: Book 1, Robert Dobbin (trans.), (Clarendon Later Ancient Philosophers), Oxford: Clarendon Press, 1998 .
 The Handbook, Nicholas P. White (trans.), Indianapolis: Hackett, 1983 .
 Enchiridion, George Long (trans.), New York: A. L. Burt, 1955 (reprint: New York: Dover, 2004) .
 The Discourses, trans. W. A. Oldfather. 2 vols. (Loeb Classical Library edition.) Cambridge, MA: Harvard University Press, 1925 and 1928. .
 Moral Discourses, Enchiridion and Fragments, Elizabeth Carter (trans.), W.H.D. Rouse (Ed.), London: J.M. Dent & Sons, 1910. at Open Library

Studies
 Jonathan Barnes, Logic and Imperial Stoa, Leiden: Brill, 1997 (Chapter Three: Epictetuts, pp. 24–127).
 Adolf Friedrich Bonhoffer, [https://www.amazon.com/Ethics-Stoic-Epictetus-Revisioning-Philosophy/dp/0820451398 The Ethics of the Stoic Epictetus, William O. Stephens trans., Bern: Peter Lang, 2000 .
 Michel Foucault, The Hermeneutics of the Subject: Lectures at the Collège de France, 1981–1982, New York: Picador, 2005 .
 Pedro P. Fuentes González. art. "Épictète", in R. Goulet (ed.), Dictionnaire des Philosophes Antiques III, Paris, CNRS, 2000, pp. 106–151 

 Brian E. Johnson, The Role Ethics of Epictetus: Stoicism in Ordinary Life, Lanham: Lexington Books, 2014 .
 A. A. Long, Epictetus: A Stoic and Socratic Guide to Life, Oxford: Oxford University Press, 2002 .
 Theodore Scaltsas, Andrew S. Mason (ed.), The Philosophy of Epictetus. Oxford: Oxford University Press, 2007 .
 Keith Seddon, Epictetus' Handbook and the Tablet of Cebes: Guides to Stoic Living, Routledge, 2005.
 Werner Sohn, Epictetus: Ein erzkonservativer Bildungsroman mit liberalen Eselsohren (German version) Norderstedt: BoD, 2010 .
 William O. Stephens, Stoic Ethics: Epictetus and Happiness as Freedom, London: Continuum, 2007 .

 External links 

 
 
 
 
 Works by Epictetus at the Internet Classics Archive
 Works by Epictetus at the Stoic Therapy eLibrary
 
 
 Dialogue between Hadrian and Epictetus – a fictitious 2nd or 3rd century composition, translated into English in The Knickerbocker magazine, August 1857
 Commentary on the Enchiridion of Epictetus by Simplicius of Cilicia (6th century)
 Stockdale on Stoicism I: The Stoic Warrior's Triad  by James Stockdale
 Who Was Epictetus?
 Stockdale on Stoicism II: Master of My Fate  by James Stockdale
 Epicteti dissertationes ab Arriano digestae'', Heinrich Schenkl (ed.), Lipsiae, in aedibus B. G. Teubneri, 1916.

135 deaths
55 births
1st-century Greek people
1st-century philosophers
1st-century Romans
2nd-century Greek people
2nd-century philosophers
2nd-century Romans
Ancient Greek ethicists
Ancient Greek slaves and freedmen
Imperial Roman slaves and freedmen
Roman-era Phrygians
Roman-era Stoic philosophers
People from Pamukkale